The 2021–22 Texas A&M–Corpus Christi Islanders men's basketball team represented Texas A&M University–Corpus Christi in the 2021–22 NCAA Division I men's basketball season. The Islanders, led by first-year head coach Steve Lutz, competed as members of the Southland Conference.  With the exception of four games at the on-campus Dugan Wellness Center, they played most of their home games at American Bank Center. Both venues are in Corpus Christi, Texas. They finished the season 23–12, 7–7 in Southland play to finish in fourth place. As the No. 4 seed, they defeated Houston Baptist, Nicholls, and Southeastern Louisiana to win the Southland tournament. They received the conference’s automatic bid to the NCAA tournament as a No. 16 seed in the Midwest Region, where they lost in the First Four to Texas Southern.

Previous season
The Islanders finished the 2020–21 season 5–19, 2–13 in Southland play to finish in last place. Since only the top 10 teams in the conference qualify for the Southland tournament, the Islanders failed to qualify.

Roster

Schedule and results

|-
!colspan=9 style=| Non-conference Regular season

|-
!colspan=9 style=| Southland Conference season

|-
!colspan=9 style=| Southland tournament

|-
!colspan=9 style=|NCAA tournament

Source

References

Texas A&M–Corpus Christi Islanders men's basketball seasons
Texas AandM-Corpus Christi Islanders
Texas AandM-Corpus Christi Islanders men's basketball
Texas AandM-Corpus Christi Islanders men's basketball
Texas A&M-Corpus Christi